National Cat Day is celebrated in various countries. In some areas it is an awareness day to raise public awareness of cat adoption.

United States and Canada

In the US and Canada, National Cat Day is an awareness day to raise public awareness of cat adoption, taking  place on August 8 in Canada and October 29 in the United States.

The National Cat Day website states that the holiday was first celebrated in 2005 "to help galvanize the public to recognize the number of cats that need to be rescued each year and also to encourage cat lovers to celebrate the cat(s) in their life for the unconditional love and companionship they bestow upon us." The day was founded by Colleen Paige, a pet and family lifestyle expert, who was supported by the American Society for the Prevention of Cruelty to Animals, which is a nonprofit pet adoption organization.

Japan
In Japan, National Cat Day is celebrated on February 22, as the date resembles the words "nyan nyan nyan" (meow meow meow). The date was decided on this date in a poll between cat-keepers by the Executive Cat Day Committee in 1978. It is celebrated with people posing with photographs of themselves with their pet cats, and businesses selling cat-themed cuisine.

Russia
In Russia, National Cat Day is celebrated on March 1.

References

External links
National Cat Day Facebook Page

February observances
March observances
October observances
August observances
Observances in the United States
Observances in Japan
Observances in Russia
Cats in the United States
Cats in Canada